The 1995 edition of the Campeonato Carioca kicked off on January 28, 1995 and ended on June 25, 1995. It is the official tournament organized by FFERJ (Federação de Futebol do Estado do Rio de Janeiro, or Rio de Janeiro State Football Federation. Only clubs based in the Rio de Janeiro State are allowed to play. Sixteen teams contested this edition. Fluminense won the title for the 28th time. Entrerriense, São Cristóvão, Friburguense and Campo Grande were relegated.

System
The tournament would be divided in four stages:
 Taça Guanabara: The sixteen teams were divided into two groups of eight. the teams all played in double round-robin format against the teams of their own group. The four best teams in each group qualified to the Second phase. However, the qualified team with the worst performance would dispute a playoff against the winner of the Módulo Intermediário's playoffs. The teams with the most points in each group went to the finals of the Taça Guanabara. Bonus points were given for the top team in each group's first and second half, and the winner of the Taça Guanabara.
 Módulo Intermediário: The equivalent of the Second Level: The eighteen teams were divided into two groups; one with eight and other with ten, with the teams all played in double round-robin format against the teams of their own group. The two best teams of Group A would be promoted to the First Level for 1996. However, the winner of Group A would dispute a playoff against the winner of Group B for a berth on the playoff against the Taça Guanabara's worst qualified team. 
 Relegation Playoff: The bottom two teams of each group in the Taça Guanabara would dispute that phase. played in a double round-robin format against each other. the two teams with the fewest points were relegated.
 Second phase: The remaining eight teams all played in a double round-robin format against each other. the team with the most points was champion.

Championship

Taça Guanabara

Group A

Group B

Finals

Módulo Intermediário

Group C

Group D

Finals

Playoffs

Relegation group
Originally, Campo Grande and São Cristóvão were relegated, to be replaced by Barra Mansa and Bayer. However, for 1996, the federation decided to reduce the championship to twelve teams and, in addition to not promoting any team from the Módulo Intermediário, inexplicably relegated Entrerriense (8th place) and Friburguense (12th place).

Second phase

References

Campeonato Carioca seasons
Carioca